Dabiq is a town in northern Syria, about  northeast of Aleppo and around  south of Syria's border with Turkey. It is administratively part of the Akhtarin nahiyah (subdistrict) of the A'zaz District of Aleppo Governorate. Nearby localities include Mare' to the southwest, Sawran to the northwest, and Akhtarin town to the southeast. In the 2004 census, Dabiq had a population of 3,364. The town was the site of the battle of Marj Dabiq in 1516, in which the Ottoman Empire decisively defeated the Mamluk Sultanate.

In Islamic eschatology, it is believed that Dabiq is one of two possible locations (the other is Amaq) for an epic battle between invading Christians and the defending Muslims which will result in a Muslim victory and mark the beginning of the end of times. The Islamic terrorist group Islamic State believes Dabiq is where an epic and decisive battle will take place with Christian forces of the West, and have named their online magazine after the village. After being driven out of the town of Dabiq by the Turkish military and Syrian rebels in October 2016, IS replaced this publication with a new one named Rumiyah.

History
During Caliph Sulayman's reign (715–717), Dabiq, near the Arab–Byzantine frontier, succeeded Jabiyah's role as the main military camp in Syria.

Dabiq was visited by Syrian geographer Yaqut al-Hamawi in the early 13th-century, during Ayyubid rule. He noted that it was "a village of the 'Azaz District lying 4 leagues from Halab (Aleppo). Near it is a green and pleasant meadow, where the Omayyad troops encamped, when they made the celebrated expedition against Al Massissah, which was to have been continued even to the walls of Constantinople. The tomb of Caliph Sulayman ibn Abd al-Malik, who led the expedition, lies here."

In August 2014 the Islamic State (IS) conquered the town, destroying the Sulayman ibn Abd al-Malik shrine. On 16 October 2016, Syrian National Army rebels captured the town from IS.

In Islamic eschatology 
In Islamic eschatology as found in the Hadith, the area of Dabiq is mentioned as a place of some of the events of the Muslim Malahim (which would equate to the Christian apocalypse, or Armageddon). Abu Hurayrah, companion to Muhammad, reported in his Hadith that Muhammad said:

Scholars and hadith commentators suggest that the word Romans refers to Christians. The hadith further relates the subsequent Muslim victory, followed by the peaceful takeover of Constantinople with invocations of takbir and tasbih, and finally the defeat of the Masih ad-Dajjal following the return and descent of Jesus Christ.

References

Bibliography

 

Apocalypticism
Islamic eschatology